Beatrice Cenci is a 1941 Italian historical drama film directed by Guido Brignone and starring Carola Höhn, Giulio Donadio and Tina Lattanzi. It is one of several films portraying the story of the sixteenth century Italian noblewoman Beatrice Cenci.

The film's sets were designed by the art director Guido Fiorini. The costume design was by Gino Sensani.

Cast
 Carola Höhn as Beatrice Cenci  
 Giulio Donadio as Francesco Cenci  
 Tina Lattanzi as Lucrezia Cenci  
 Osvaldo Valenti as Giacomo Cenci  
 Elli Parvo as Angela  
 Enzo Fiermonte as Olimpio Calvetti
 Sandro Ruffini as Il giudice Moscato  
 Luigi Pavese as Catalano 
 Marcello Giorda as Il presidente del tribunale  
 Arturo Bragaglia as Don Lorenzo 
 Iginia Armilli 
 Franco Cuppini 
 Aulo D'Anzio as Il segretario del giudice  
 Giovanni Dal Cortivo as Il brigante nella grotta  
 Gualtiero De Angelis as Curzio  
 Angelo Dessy 
 Carlo Duse as Il capitano dei gendarmi  
 Pina Gallini as La governante di Don Lorenzo  
 Marino Girolami 
 Gina Graziosi 
 Nino Marchesini as Il castellano dei Colonna  
 Nino Marchetti as Un contadino della Petrella  
 Giovanni Onorato 
 Mario Ortensi 
 Roberto Pasetti as L'usuraio 
 Emilio Petacci as Farinacci 
 Gina Ror 
 Aris Valeri

References

Bibliography
 Waters, Sandra. Narrating the Italian Historical Novel. ProQuest, 2009.

External links
 

1941 films
1940s historical drama films
1940s Italian-language films
Italian historical drama films
Films directed by Guido Brignone
Films set in the 16th century
Cultural depictions of Beatrice Cenci
Italian black-and-white films
1941 drama films
1940s Italian films